The 2007–08 SM-liiga season was the 33rd season of the SM-liiga, the top level of ice hockey in Finland. 14 teams participated in the league, and Karpat Oulu won the championship.

Regular season

Playoffs

Preliminary round 
 HIFK - TPS 2:0 (5:4 P, 1:0)
 Ilves - Lukko 2:1 (4:2, 3:4 P, 1:0)

Quarterfinalss 
 Kärpät - Ilves 4:2 (7:1, 2:3, 7:5, 0:3, 6:3, 2:1 P)
 Blues - HIFK 4:1 (1:2, 6:3, 6:1, 3:0, 4:1)
 Jokerit - Pelicans 4:2 (8:4, 1:3, 3:2 P, 5:4, 4:5 P, 5:4 P)
 Tappara - JYP 4:2 (2:1, 4:5 P, 4:2, 0:3, 4:1, 6:2)

Semifinal 
 Kärpät - Tappara 4:0 (4:3, 4:2, 3:2, 7:3)
 Blues - Jokerit 4:3 (2:3 P, 4:3 P, 2:3 P, 0:4, 5:1, 2:1 P, 5:3)

3rd place 
 Jokerit - Tappara 3:4

Final 
 Kärpät - Espoo Blues 4:1 (3:1, 2:1 P, 2:3 P, 4:0, 5:1)

External links
 SM-liiga official website

1
Finnish
Liiga seasons